Paweł Juraszek (born 8 October 1994) is a Polish swimmer. He competed in the men's 50 metre freestyle event at the 2016 Summer Olympics. At the 2017 World Aquatics Championships in Budapest he finished fifth in the 50 m freestyle, setting a new national record of 21.47.

References

External links
 

1994 births
Living people
Olympic swimmers of Poland
Swimmers at the 2016 Summer Olympics
Sportspeople from Tel Aviv
Polish male freestyle swimmers
Swimmers at the 2020 Summer Olympics
21st-century Polish people